Dhodial Pheasantry (or Dhodial Pheasant Center) is a pheasantry and breeding center for several species of pheasants situated in Mansehra District, Pakistan. It has been set up for the purposes of research, conservation, tourism, and education. The pheasantry has around 250 exhibits providing shelter to around 4,000 birds.

Location
Dhodial Pheasantry is located on Karakorum Highway in the village of Dhodial, Mansehra District, Khyber Pakhtunkhwa, Pakistan,  from Abbottabad, towards the village of Shinkiari. The Dhodial campus of Hazara University is located near the facility.

History
Dhodial Pheasantry was established in 1984 by the Khyber Pakhtunkhwa Wildlife Department with the support of the IUCN and the World Pheasant Association.

The Inevitable Flight, a documentary film about this issue, was made by a Pakistani Canadian documentary filmmaker, Azfar Rizvi. This brought the issue under public scrutiny. Subsequently, other factors kicked in and mobilized enough public and political support that the relocation was cancelled.

Public services
An information center has been developed in the aviary to accommodate visitors, facilitate researchers, and spread awareness among local pheasant breeders. More than 500 people visit the aviary daily. The entry fee for the aviary is 10 Pakistani rupees per person.

In 2011, the aviary was closed to the public due to the supposed spread of bird flu. By July, all of the birds had been vaccinated and the aviary was opened to the public again on July 5, 2011.

Conservation efforts
The cheer pheasant, which became extinct in Pakistan, was reintroduced in the region. The World Pheasants Association sent 90 eggs of the species to the Dhodial Pheasantry. Among the eggs which hatched, the mortality was high and remained high till 1995. This situation got better in 1996. In 1997, a parent flock of 40 pairs was raised and eventually reintroduction of the cheer pheasant in Hazara District was carried out. As of 2007, there are around 60 pairs of cheer pheasant in the Dhodial Pheasantry.

Species

Birds

Pheasants
Dhodial Pheasantry holds captive 38 of the 52 species of pheasants found in the world. Some of these include:
Bar-tailed pheasant
Blue eared pheasant
Brown eared pheasant
Cheer pheasant
Common pheasant
Elliot's pheasant
Edwards's pheasant
Golden pheasant
Green peafowl
Grey francolin
Himalayan monal
Indian peafowl
Kalij pheasant
Koklass pheasant
Lady Amherst's pheasant
Reeves's pheasant
Satyr tragopan
Siamese fireback
Silver pheasant
Swinhoe's pheasant
Western tragopan
White eared pheasant

Other
Cranes
Demoiselle crane
Waterfowls
Bar-headed goose
Gadwall
Mallard
Northern pintail
Poachard
Tufted duck

Mammals
The facility also houses some species of mammals:
Bengal tiger
Chinkara
Leopard
Urial

See also
The Inevitable Flight

References

External links

Related media at zkf.org.pk
 Video tour by hazara.com.pk

Mansehra District
Wildlife conservation in Pakistan
Bird conservation
Pheasants